Palm Springs is a 2020 American science fiction romantic comedy film directed by Max Barbakow (in his feature directorial debut), from a screenplay by Andy Siara. It stars Andy Samberg (who co-produced the film), Cristin Milioti, and J. K. Simmons, and follows two strangers who meet at a wedding in Palm Springs only to get stuck in a time loop.

Palm Springs had its world premiere at the Sundance Film Festival on January 26, 2020, and was simultaneously released on Hulu and in select theaters by Neon on July 10, 2020. The film was praised for the cast's performances and its use of the concept. At the 78th Golden Globe Awards, it earned two nominations: Best Motion Picture – Musical or Comedy and Best Actor in a Motion Picture – Musical or Comedy for Samberg. Among other accolades, it won Best Comedy at the 26th Critics' Choice Awards.

Plot 
On November 9, in Palm Springs, Nyles wakes up with his girlfriend Misty, who is cheating on him. That evening, Nyles and Sarah bond at a wedding reception for Sarah's sister Tala and her fiancé Abe. They leave the party to have sex in the nearby desert. As he undresses, Nyles is shot with an arrow fired by an assailant. Nyles, injured, crawls into a cave, warning Sarah not to follow him. Concerned for Nyles, Sarah follows him and is sucked into a vortex.

Sarah wakes up and realizes that it is November 9 again. She confronts Nyles, and he explains that by following him into the cave, Sarah has become stuck in a time loop with him; falling asleep or dying resets the loop, repeating November 9. Sarah tries various methods to escape the loop, but is unsuccessful. Nyles, having already been in the loop for a long time, has become complacent and carefree, abandoning hopes of escape.

Nyles and Sarah become close friends, and Sarah adopts Nyles' carefree and reckless lifestyle. They both begin excitedly looking forward to their next adventures together. Nyles reveals that the man who shot him, Roy, is from the wedding and that Nyles inadvertently trapped him in the time loop. In revenge, Roy sometimes hunts Nyles, torturing or murdering him.

One night, Nyles and Sarah camp out in the desert, get high, and have sex. The day after, Sarah sleeps in and is woken up by Abe, who she had slept with on November 8, the night before the wedding. Guilt-ridden, Sarah refuses to talk to Nyles about their previous night, expressing nihilism about their life in the loop. After being pulled over by Roy disguised as a cop, Sarah runs him over. Sarah and Nyles argue, leading Nyles to admit that he had slept with Sarah many times in the loop, something he previously lied about. An angry Sarah begins avoiding Nyles.

Nyles feels lost without Sarah and spends multiple days aimlessly moping, discovering Abe and Sarah's affair in the process. One day, Nyles visits Roy at his home in Irvine and they reconcile. Meanwhile, Sarah, resolved to escape the time loop, spends her days studying to become an expert in quantum physics and general relativity. After some experimentation, she believes that exploding oneself in the cave will break the time loop. Sarah offers Nyles a chance to escape with her, but he confesses his love for her and asks if they can stay in the loop together forever. Sarah refuses, resolved to try her escape plan without him.

Sarah attends the wedding one last time, giving a heartfelt speech to her sister, the bride, and then travels to the cave with explosives. Nyles, in a change of heart, rushes to the cave to leave with Sarah. He admits that he would rather die with her in an explosion than remain in the loop alone. Sarah reciprocates his feelings, and they kiss in the cave, as she presses the detonator. It is revealed that her plan has worked, and that it is now November 10. The two are relaxing in the pool of a nearby house, which Nyles showed Sarah during one of their loops, when the residents return and catch them in the pool.

In a mid-credits scene, Roy, having gotten a voicemail from Sarah explaining her plan to escape the loop, returns to the wedding and asks Nyles if the plan would work.  A confused Nyles does not recognize Roy.  Roy smiles, realizing that Nyles is out of the loop and Sarah's escape plan works.

Cast
 Andy Samberg as Nyles, Misty's boyfriend and Sarah's love interest
 Cristin Milioti as Sarah Wilder, half-sister of the bride Tala
 J. K. Simmons as Roy Schlieffen, another person trapped within the time loop
 Peter Gallagher as Howard Wilder, Sarah and Tala's father
 Meredith Hagner as Misty, Nyles's girlfriend and Tala's bridesmaid
 Camila Mendes as Tala Anne Wilder, Sarah's sister and the bride
 Tyler Hoechlin as Abraham Eugene Trent "Abe" Schlieffen, Tala's fiancé
 Chris Pang as Trevor, the wedding officiant
 Jacqueline Obradors as Pia Wilder, Sarah's stepmother and Tala's mother
 June Squibb as Nana Schlieffen, Abe's grandmother
 Tongayi Chirisa as Jerry Schlieffen, a groomsman and one of Nyles' hookups
 Dale Dickey as Darla, a woman in a bar
 Conner O'Malley as Randy, a groomsman
 Jena Friedman as Daisy the Bartender
 Brian Duffy as Spuds
 Martin Kildare as Ted the Bartender
 Clifford V. Johnson as Professor

Production
Director Max Barbakow and screenwriter Andy Siara came up with the idea as students at the American Film Institute, "with an equal eye on Jungian philosophical ideas and the pragmatic importance of writing a small-budget film that would be easy to produce". They imagined the script as "an absurdist comedic mumblecore take on Leaving Las Vegas, centered on a despondent thirtysomething who travels to Palm Springs to kill himself, only to slowly rediscover a sense of meaning in his life." When Siara went on to write for the television show Lodge 49, they redeveloped the script into a more ambitious project with a sci-fi edge. While Groundhog Day was a fundamentally important starting point for the use of a time loop in a romantic comedy, Barbakow and Siara knew they needed to distance their script from the film. This led to starting with Nyles already within the time loop, making the film like "a sequel to a movie that doesn't exist" according to Siara, and then adding Sarah as a second character within the loop to serve as a point of navigation for the audience.

The project was announced in November 2018 after it secured a tax credit to film in California; however, given the limitations of that tax credit, they were forced to film in the Los Angeles area rather than Palm Springs. Andy Samberg was announced as starring in the film. In March 2019, Cristin Milioti and J. K. Simmons joined the cast. Camila Mendes was added in April.

Filming began in April 2019, and lasted for 21 days. Shots feature the Cabazon Dinosaurs.

Release
Palm Springs had its world premiere at the Sundance Film Festival on January 26, 2020. Shortly after, Neon and Hulu acquired distribution rights to the film. Neon and Hulu reportedly paid $17,500,000.69 for the film, breaking the previous record for the highest sale of a film from Sundance by $0.69. Later reports put the deal closer to $22 million after guarantees were factored in.

The film was released in the United States digitally on Hulu and in select drive-in theaters on July 10, 2020. Hulu claimed that the film also set the opening weekend record by "netting more hours watched over its first three days than any other film" in the platform's history. In August 2020, it was reported that 8.1 percent of subscribers had watched the film over its first month. In November, Variety reported the film was the 26th-most watched straight-to-streaming title of 2020 up to that point.

In January 2021, a commentary cut of the film featuring Samberg, Milioti, Barbakow, and Siara was released; Hulu claimed it was the first such release by a streaming service.

Reception

Box office 
Palm Springs grossed $164,000 from 66 theaters in its opening weekend. It played in about 30 theaters in its second weekend, and made $101,000.

Critical response 
Palm Springs was met with critical acclaim. The website's critics consensus reads, "Strong performances, assured direction, and a refreshingly original concept make Palm Springs a romcom that's easy to fall in love with." On Metacritic the film has a weighted average score of 83 out of 100, based on 42 critics, indicating "universal acclaim."

Writing for IndieWire, David Ehrlich gave the film a grade B+ and praised the film for cleverly reworking the Groundhog Day formula: "The movie always seems on the brink of biting off more than a super energetic 90-minute comedy can chew, and the sheer momentum of the storytelling doesn't give the story time to slow down." Peter Debruge of Variety gave the film a positive review, and wrote: "Palm Springs is to time-loop movies as Zombieland was to the undead genre: It's an irreverent take on a form where earlier iterations were obliged to take themselves seriously." Vince Mancini of Uproxx gave the film a positive review, saying: "Palm Springs is the perfect kind of art-comedy. It comes on like a brilliantly silly little lark and eventually lands on you like a ton of bricks."

Metacritic summarized various critics' end-of-year top lists, and ranked Palm Springs in 12th place overall. IGN named the film their Best Movie of the Year 2020.

Accolades

See also
 List of films featuring time loops

References

External links
 
 
 Script 

2020 films
2020 romantic comedy films
2020s science fiction comedy films
American romantic comedy films
American science fiction comedy films
American science fiction romance films
Time loop films
2020 independent films
Films about weddings in the United States
Films set in deserts
Films set in Austin, Texas
Films set in Irvine, California
Films set in Palm Springs, California
Films shot in California
Hulu original films
2020s English-language films
2020s American films